Arrowhead has been the name of two ships of the United States Navy. 

 , a planned , was cancelled

United States Navy ship names